Melaleuca sculponeata is a plant in the myrtle family, Myrtaceae, and is endemic to the south-west of Western Australia. It is a small, rare shrub with fleshy leaves and white heads of flowers.

Description
Its leaves are arranged in alternating pairs, each pair at right angles to the ones above and below (decussate) so that the leaves form four rows along the stems. The leaf is concave on the upper surface, convex on the lower surface where 6 to 8 oil glands are visible but not prominent.

The flowers are white and arranged in heads on the sides of the branches. Each head contains 4 to 12 individual flowers. The stamens are arranged in five bundles around the flowers and there are 8 to 12 stamens per bundle.

Taxonomy and naming
Melaleuca sculponeata was first formally described in 1992 by Bryan Barlow in Nuytsia as a new species. The specific epithet (sculponeata) is from the Latin sculponea meaning "wooden shoe" referring to the leaves, when removed from the stem, appearing like clogs.

Distribution and habitat
Melaleuca sculponeata occurs in two small, isolated populations in the Fitzgerald River and the Lake King districts in the Esperance Plains and Mallee biogeographic regions. The plants grow in sand on sandplains.

Conservation
Melaleuca sculpeonata is listed as "Priority Three" by the Government of Western Australia Department of Parks and Wildlife meaning that it is known from only a few locations and is not currently in imminent danger.

References

sciotostyla
Myrtales of Australia
Plants described in 1992
Endemic flora of Western Australia